Aviva Uri (Hebrew: אביבה אורי; March 12, 1922 – September 1, 1989) was an Israeli painter.

Biography
Aviva Uri studied dance with Gertrude Kraus. In 1941, she married Moshe Levin, with whom she had a daughter, Rachel.  In 1943, she studied painting with Moshe Castel, continuing with David Hendler in 1944. She married Hendler in 1963. She cultivated an unusual appearance, wearing white face makeup and dark eye-shadow, and oversized black clothing. She deliberately falsified her age, claiming she was born in 1927. She died in Tel Aviv in 1989.

Artistic style
Uri's expressive drawings focused on line and composition. Her abstract drawings link her to the "New Horizons" group,  but suggest an alternative to the abstract art being created in the country: instead of oils, she created drawings on paper; instead of the professional mixing of colors, she used no coloration; instead of Paris, she was influenced by Japan and China, or other individualists (Hans Hartung). Uri's free line influenced younger artists, such as Raffi Lavie.

Awards and prizes
 Dizengoff Prize for Painting and Sculpture, Tel Aviv, 1953
 Dizengoff Prize, Tel Aviv Museum, 1956
 Sandberg Prize for Israeli Art, Israel Museum, Jerusalem, 1976
 Prize of the Lea Porat Council of Culture and Art, 1985
 America-Israel Cultural Foundation, 1986
 Histadrut Prize, 1989
 Gutman Prize, 1989

See also
Visual arts in Israel

References

External links 

 Aviva Uri Chapters from the book about her life in Hebrew
 Aviva Uri Silkscreens & Mixed media on paper Har-El Printers & Publishers 1977 1978

Israeli women painters
1922 births
1989 deaths
Sandberg Prize recipients
20th-century Israeli painters
20th-century Israeli women artists
Jewish artists
Burials at Kiryat Shaul Cemetery